A partial lunar eclipse will take place on September 28, 2034. This will the second-shortest partial lunar eclipse for the 21st century lasting 26 minutes 42 seconds. On February 13, 2082, a slightly shorter partial eclipse will occur, lasting 25 minutes 30 seconds.

Visibility

Related lunar eclipses

Lunar year series

See also
List of lunar eclipses and List of 21st-century lunar eclipses

References

External links

2034-09
2034-09
2034 in science